Domenica may refer to:

People
Maria Domenica Mazzarello
Maria Domenica Michelotti
Maria Domenica Brun Barbantini
Maria Domenica Mantovani
Maria Domenica Scanferla (1726–1763), Italian painter
Elena Domenica Rubeo
Domenica Ananias Cancino, Chilean field hockey player
Domenica Hodak, American soccer player
Domenica Michelle Azuero Gonzalez, Ecuadorian BMX rider
Domenica Žuvela, Croatian singer

Communities
Santa Domenica Talao, village in Calabria, Italy
Santa Domenica Vittoria, town in Sicily, Italy

Other
 Domenica (American band)
 Domenica (Greek band)
Domenica (1952 film), a French drama film
 Domenica (2001 film), a 2001 Italian film
 L'altra domenica
 La Domenica del Corriere
 Il sole di domenica
 Il Blues della domenica sera
 L'Osservatore della Domenica
 Il pranzo della domenica
 Il giornalino della Domenica
 Doménica Montero

See also 
 Dominica, an island country in the Caribbean